Everett School may refer to:

Everett School (Sioux City, Iowa)
Everett School (St. Joseph, Missouri)